Latridius is a genus of beetles in the family Latridiidae, containing the following species:

 Latridius amplus Johnson, 1977
 Latridius assimilis (Mannerheim, 1844)
 Latridius brevicollis (Thomson, 1868)
 Latridius canariensis (Palm, 1972)
 Latridius consimilis (Mannerheim, 1844)
 Latridius crenatus (Le Conte, 1855)
 Latridius desertus (Fall, 1899)
 Latridius gemellatus (Mannerheim, 1844)
 Latridius hirtus Gyllenhal, 1827
 Latridius minutus (Linnaeus, 1767)
 Latridius mongolicus Rücker, 1983
 Latridius nigritus (Fall, 1899)
 Latridius peacockae (Sen Gupta, 1976)
 Latridius perminutus Johnson, 1977
 Latridius reflexus (LeConte, 1855)
 Latridius porcatus (Herbst, 1793)
 Latridius protensicollis Mannerheim, 1843

References

Latridiidae genera